Ud-e Molla (also Romanized as ‘Ūd-e Mollā, ‘Owd Mollā, and ‘Ūd Mollā; also known as ‘Owl Mollā, Own Mallah, Own Molla, Avanmalleh, Ogh Mūlāk, and Oqūlāk) is a village in Shirvan Rural District, in the Central District of Borujerd County, Lorestan Province, Iran. At the 2006 census, its population was 119, in 28 families.

References 

Towns and villages in Borujerd County